Neen Sollars is a civil parish in Shropshire, England.  It contains 17 listed buildings that are recorded in the National Heritage List for England.  Of these, one is at Grade II*, the middle of the three grades, and the others are at Grade II, the lowest grade.  The parish contains the village of Neen Sollars and the surrounding countryside.  Most of the listed buildings are in or near the village, and these consist of a church and memorials in the churchyard, and houses, cottages and farmhouses, many of which are timber framed.  To the south of the parish are three more listed buildings, one a house, and the other two that were formerly associated with the Leominster Canal, an aqueduct and the original headquarters of the canal company.
 

Key

Buildings

References

Citations

Sources

Lists of buildings and structures in Shropshire